Foy's Lake Concord is a theme park complex covering nearly  at Foy's Lake, in the Pahartali neighborhood of Chittagong, Bangladesh. The complex consists of a dry theme park (Foy's Lake Concord Amusement World), a water park (Sea World Concord), and Foy's Lake Resort. It was established in 2004 by Concord Entertainment Company Limited.

History
They broke ground in November of that year. In the first five years, the company invested 1.6 billion Bangladeshi taka ($23.7M as of 2009) in the site.

As of 2018, Concord said daily attendance can reach 5,000 on holiday weekends if the weather is fine.

Attractions 
The complex consists of two theme parks and a resort. There are boating facilities and floating restaurants.

Foy's Lake Concord Amusement World

The dry park has shops and carnival rides such as a baby carousel, family roller coaster, bumper cars, coffee cups, and a ferris wheel.

Sea World Concord

The water park has a wave pool, children's pool, splash pools, and water coaster rides.

Foy's Lake Resort

The resort has lakeside cottages and chalets. Bradt Travel Guides describes the resort as, "geared primarily to the well-heeled domestic honeymooners seeking a lakeside escape for a day".

See also 
 Fantasy Kingdom

References

External links 
 

Amusement parks in Bangladesh
Tourist attractions in Chittagong
2004 establishments in Bangladesh